Charles Keith Linney (26 August 1912 – 12 October 1992) played first-class cricket for Somerset from 1931 to 1937. He was born in Hobart, Tasmania, Australia and died in Tunbridge Wells, Kent. His father George, who was born in Guildford, Surrey and died in Weston-super-Mare, Somerset, played first-class cricket in one match for Tasmania.

Linney was a left-handed middle or lower order batsman and an occasional left-arm medium pace bowler. Linney had only one season for regular cricket as a professional player, 1931, when he appeared in 19 matches for Somerset and scored 395 first-class runs at an average of 17.17. His one score of more than 50 was an innings of 60 against Surrey at Taunton. In Somerset's mobile and amateur-dominated batting line-up of the 1930s, Linney's next home match after this success saw him batting at No 10 in the order. Wisden Cricketers' Almanack for 1932 noted that Linney played some "bright innings". But after this one season he played only occasionally: seven matches in 1932, one in 1934 and five in 1937, and in none of these matches did he achieve any notable success.

References

1912 births
1992 deaths
English cricketers
Australian cricketers
Somerset cricketers
Cricketers from Hobart
Australian emigrants to England
Australian people of English descent